Carposina euschema is a moth in the Carposinidae family. It was described by John David Bradley in 1965 and is found in Uganda.

References

Carposinidae genus list at Butterflies and Moths of the World of the Natural History Museum

Endemic fauna of Uganda
Carposinidae
Moths described in 1965
Moths of Africa